Cheke Holo (also called Maringe or Mariŋe, A’ara, Holo, Kubonitu) is an Oceanic language spoken in the Solomon Islands. Its speakers live on Santa Isabel Island.

Phonology 
The phonology of Cheke Holo shows some peculiarities, shared with other Santa Isabel languages, like the aspirated stops and the voiceless sonorants. The five-vowel system instead conforms to the prototypical system of the Oceanic area .  has /x/ rather than /ɣʰ/.

Morphosyntax
Verbs in Cheke Holo are marked neither for tense nor for person, although they can be prefixed with fa- (a causative marker) and they take enclitics. Among the possible clitics are the direct object pronouns, the completive aspect markers hi and hila, and the continuative aspect marker u .

Reduplication is commonly employed with verb roots to express iteration or intensification and as a valency changing device (from intransitive to transitive), although there are attested cases of adjective and (less so) noun reduplication . Different types of reduplications are possible in Cheke Holo:

 Full reduplication
 /vra/ 'jump up' > /vravra/ 'be quick to act'
 Partial (or White's rule) reduplication
 /bela/ 'wooden platform' > /beabela/ 'stack up firewood'
 Syllable reduplication
 /nolo/ 'to walk' > /nonolo/ 'go walking about'
 /kmokhu/ 'stop' > /kmokmohu/ 'continue to cease'
 /fruni/ 'cover' > /fufruni/ 'cover completely' (when the second consonant of a cluster is /r/, this is dropped in the reduplicated syllable)

Notes

References

External links
Keha Tarai Mala Lao Legu Narone Anglican devotional material in Cheke Holo (1934)
Buka Tharai Ka Cheke Marine Portions of the Book of Common Prayer in Cheke Holo (1973) digitized by Richard Mammana

Languages of the Solomon Islands
Ysabel languages